Open Up Your Love is an album by The Whispers. Released in 1977, this album reached number 23 on the Billboard Soul Albums chart. This was their last album on Don Cornelius and Dick Griffey's Soul Train Records before transitioning over to manager Dick Griffey's SOLAR Records.

The single "I'm Gonna Make You My Wife" was featured in the motion picture Waiting to Exhale, but did not appear on the soundtrack.

Track listing

Credits 

 A&R, Coordinator – Marge Meoli
 Arranged By [Background Vocal Arrangements] – Nick Caldwell
 Arranged By [Rhythm Arrangements] – Gene Page, Jerry Peters
 Arranged By [String And Horn Arrangements] – Bruce Miller (2), Gene Page
 Bass – Alphonso Johnson, Wilton Felder
 Design [Album] – Gribbitt, Tim Bryant (2)
 Drums – Ed Greene (2), James Gadson
 Engineer [Mix] – Steve Hodge
 Engineer [Recording] – Mic Litz, Peter Granet, Steve Hirsch, Steve Mazlow
 Executive-Producer – Dick Griffey, Don Cornelius
 Guitar – David T. Walker, Dean Parks, Lee Ritenour, Marlo Henerson, Wah Wah Watson
 Keyboards – Joseph Sample, Reginald (Sonny) Burke
 Percussion – Paulinho Da Costa
 Photography By – Ron Slenzak
 Producer – Dick Griffey, Don Cornelius, The Whispers
 Soloist, Bass [Fretless Bass] – Alphonso Johnson (tracks: B3)
 Soloist, Tenor Saxophone – Terry Harrington (tracks: B4)

Charts

Singles

References

External links
 

1977 albums
The Whispers albums